Dusky woodcock has been split into two species:

 Javan woodcock, Scolopax saturata
 New Guinea woodcock, Scolopax rosenbergii

Birds by common name